Indian Institute of Management Bangalore (IIM Bangalore or IIMB) is a public business school and Institute of National Importance located in Bangalore, India. Founded in 1973, it was the third IIM to be established, after IIM Calcutta and IIM Ahmedabad.

The institute offers Post Graduate, Doctoral, Executive Education and Certificate Programmes. The MBA programme is the flagship programme of the BSchool  and is offered in three modes - one year full-time, two year full-time and two year executive (weekend).

The Post Graduate Programme in Management (PGP), is the traditional flagship two-year full-time residential MBA programme, for candidates with 0–4 years experience and admitted through the Common Admission Test (CAT). IIM Bangalore offers a flagship one-year full-time residential MBA programme - the Executive Post Graduate Programme in Management (EPGP), modeled on global MBA pedagogy, for candidates with higher experience and admitted through Graduate Management Admission Test (GMAT),

IIMB also offers two-year part-time executive MBA programme for working executives, a one-year full-time programme - Master of Management Studies in Public Policy and a two-year full-time MBA programme in Business Analytics, apart from the Doctor of Philosophy (PhD). The Certificate Programmes include the N. S. Ramaswamy Pre-doctoral Fellowship (NSR Pre-doc), which is a one-year full-time apprenticeship programme and the Mahatma Gandhi National Fellowship (MGNF), a two-year academic programme.

History 
In 1972, a committee headed by Ravi J. Matthai, founding director of IIM Ahmedabad and IRMA, noting the rising demand for graduates of the first two prestigious IIMs namely IIM Calcutta and IIM Ahmedabad, recommended the need to have two more IIMs. The Institute at Bangalore was set up to cater exclusively to the needs of public sector enterprises. T. A. Pai and N. S. Ramaswamy were appointed as chairman and Director respectively. The institute was inaugurated by Indira Gandhi, the then Prime Minister of India, on 28 October 1973. The institute was started in St. Joseph's College of Commerce, and some other buildings, which were rented on the Langford Road. The new institute came up at the Bannerghatta Road campus in South Bangalore in 1983.

The two-year Post Graduate Programme commenced in July 1974 and the first convocation of the institute was held on 10 July 1976 with a total of 48 graduating students. On August 27, 1998, the Post Graduate Programme in Software Enterprise Management was launched with an intake 58 students. The institute's start-up incubation centre, N S Raghavan Centre for Entrepreneurial Learning (NSRCEL) came into existence in March 2002.

Motto
The motto derived from Sanskrit  (pronounced as tejasvi nāvadhītamastu) is an extract from the Shanti Mantra recited in Taittiriya Upanishad, Katha Upanishad, Mandukya Upanishad and Shvetashvatara Upanishad. The motto translates to 'Let our study be enlightening'''.

The current IIMB logo depicting the sun, was designed by the National Institute of Design and has been in use since 1994.

 Corporate placement and campus drive 
IIM Bangalore provides a wide network of corporate placement opportunities for its students. In December 2021, it collaborated internationally for exploring students' dynamics for an international experience.

Campus

The IIMB campus, occupying an area of over 100 acres, is located on Bannerghatta Road in the southern part of Bangalore. It is accessible by public transport from anywhere in the city. The Namma Metro's Pink Line, currently under construction as of June 2022, will have a halt at IIMB. IIMB is in the process of setting up its second campus near Jigani, in the city's periphery, in Anekal Taluka.

 Architecture 
IIM Bangalore was designed by Pritzker prize winning architect B. V. Doshi. Mr Doshi, also a Padma Bhushan awardee, had previously assisted Louis Kahn on the design of IIM Ahmedabad and then designed the renowned school of architecture at Ahmadabad (later renamed as CEPT). He was hence commissioned to design IIM Bangalore. The architecture of IIM Bangalore is inspired by the historic city of Fatehpur Sikri near Agra, and the Madurai temples in Tamil Nadu. The 54,000 sq mt IIMB complex, is built in granite stone, giving the campus a unique character. The conceptualisation of the campus began in 1973 and it was completed in 1983. Over the years, the once barren campus has become a green oasis with rich and diverse flora and fauna. The campus has been awarded for its sustainability practices.

Academic Blocks
The academic blocks were designed by Stein, Doshi & Bhalla architects led by B. V. Doshi and were completed by 1983. A few blocks were added later owing to the increase in the number of students being enrolled. The classes, faculty offices and other administrative entities are spread over the various blocks.

Library
The library extends membership-based services to individuals, organizations, corporations and academic institutions. Alumni are encouraged to use the library facilities at a very nominal subscription charge.

Student Housing and Sports Centre

IIMB provides accommodation facilities to all the full-time long duration programmes.  IIMB campus housing consists of 16 hostel blocks apart from one executive block and the executive accommodation at the Management Development Centre. The hostel consists of 16 blocks named from A to P. IIMB has separate facilities for soccer, cricket, tennis, basketball, volleyball, badminton, table tennis and pool. IIMB has a sports centre with courts for badminton and tennis, a gym and a swimming pool. 

Computer Centre
The institute has 24-hour internet connectivity with 600+ PCs and workstations. The campus is also fully WiFi enabled.

 Startup Hub Incubation Centre for entrepreneurs - NSRCEL 

The 'Nadathur Sarangapani Raghavan Centre for Entrepreneurial Learning', renamed NSRCEL, was set up in 2002 to aid the entrepreneurial activities at IIMB. The centre acts as an incubator for new business ideas where anyone can apply for incubation. As of April 2020, NSRCEL has incubated more than 240 start-ups with a combined value of $1.5 billion and created more than 5400 jobs. Students studying at IIMB are encouraged to leverage

 Academics 

Academic programmes
IIMB has degree granting and certificate programmes. Prior to 2018, IIM Bangalore awarded diplomas instead of degrees because the IIMs were not set up as universities through an Act of Parliament but as societies under the Societies Act. The Indian Institutes of Management Act, 2017 enacted by the Ministry of Human Resource Development in December 2017 declared IIMs as Institutes of National Importance, thereby allowing IIMs to award degrees to their students instead of diplomas. Consequently, in 2018, IIM Bangalore became the first IIM to award MBA degree to the graduates of the Post Graduate Programme and later to the executive post graduate programme – the full-time MBA programmes of the BSchool.

IIM Bangalore offers six degree-granting programmes: a full-time doctoral programme (FPM), three full-time MBA programmes (EPGP, PGP, PGPBA), an executive MBA programme (PGPEM), and a full-time programme in Public Policy (PGPPM).

 Journal : IIMB Management Review (IMR) 
IIMB Management Review (IMR) is a quarterly journal brought out by Indian Institute of Management Bangalore.
IIM Bangalore received EQUIS Accreditation for five years. EQUIS accreditation is the most comprehensive institutional accreditation system for business and management schools.

 Rankings 

Worldwide, the Financial Times has ranked IIM Bangalore 53 in the Top Global MBA Ranking 2022. They ranked the PGPM program 31 in the world in the Top 100 Masters in Management 2022 ranking. The QS Global MBA Rankings 2023 ranked IIM Bangalore's full time MBA programme 50 in the world and 10 in Asia. The executive MBA program was ranked 53 in the world in the QS Global Executive MBA Rankings 2022 and 12 in Asia.

In India, IIM Bangalore was ranked 2nd among management schools by the National Institutional Ranking Framework (NIRF) 2022. It was ranked third by Business Today "India's Top Five B-Schools Yearly Ranking In 2022".

Mentorship
IIM Bangalore successfully mentored IIM Trichy when it was established in 2011. It also mentored IIM Visakhapatnam when it was setup in 2015.

Student life
There are several student-run clubs and societies at IIM Bangalore. The student bodies are divided into clubs, mini clubs, chapters and societies which are managed by the students themselves and are governed by the Students Affairs Council. The following are the list of clubs and societies.

Students Affairs Council
It is the apex body which controls all the aspects of student life including other clubs and societies.

Academic Council
The Academic Council is an elected body that facilitates the management of the academic system at IIM Bangalore. The council acts as an interface between students and faculty and is also responsible for the elective bidding process for courses by assessing the academic needs of the student community .

Placement Committee
More than 100 companies across the globe visit the campus every year for summer and final placements. The placement processes are governed by the Career Development Services and facilitated by the Placement Committee.

Events
IIMB celebrates the Foundation Day on 28 October. The 46th Foundation Day lecture was delivered by renowned architect B.V. Doshi, who had designed the IIMB campus more than three decades ago.

Eximius

Eximius is the annual entrepreneurship summit organized by IIM Bangalore. The event has hosted several eminent speakers including Shashi Tharoor, Kiran Mazumdar-Shaw, Piyush Pandey, Mallika Sarabhai, Kris Gopalakrishnan, Kiran Bedi, Rashmi Bansal, Shaheen Mistri, Harish Hande, D R Mehta among others.

Unmaad

Unmaad is the flagship annual cultural festival of IIM Bangalore. The three-day event draws participants from across India. Unmaad features drama and music performances, dances, quizzes, debates, street plays, professional concerts and a fashion show. The event has hosted performances by prominent artistes including Farhan Akhtar, Shankar–Ehsaan–Loy, KK, Kailash Kher, Lucky Ali, Strings, Jethro Tull, Indian Ocean, etc.

Vista

Vista is an annual, international business summit hosted by IIM Bangalore. The three-day summit brings together leaders from the fields of marketing, finance, operations, human resources, consulting and social work. The platform lets students learn from business professionals through events, competitions and case studies. The event also incorporates guest speaker sessions. Previous speakers include Devi Shetty, Mukesh Ambani, Prahlad Kakkar, Kumar Mangalam Birla, Kamal Haasan, Kiran Mazumdar Shaw, Gurucharan Das, Justice Santosh Hegde, Arun Shourie, Gul Panag, M J Akbar, Nandita Das, Narain Karthikeyan and Shobhaa De.

 Yamini 

Yamini is a full-night music festival in Bangalore, organized by the Society for the Promotion of Indian Classical Music And Culture Amongst Youth (SPICMACAY) and hosted at IIMB.

 IIMBue - IIMB Leadership Conclave 
IIMB Leadership Conclave is an annual event.

 Women Leadership Summit 
Women Leadership Summit is organized every year in January by IIM Bangalore. It seeks to build gender-inclusive mind-sets among students, entrepreneurs, and corporates. The one-day event strives to create awareness through talks and workshops with prominent and inspiring personalities. The event has hosted eminent speakers including Vinita Bali, Malavika Harita, Sneha Priya, Lakshmi Ishwar, Wilma Rodrigues, Nirmala Sankaran, Neeta Revankar, Dr. Gita Sen, Gauri Jayaram, Sanjaya Sharma, etc.

 Research 
IIMB research centres include: the Centre for Capital Markets and Risk Management (CCMRM), Centre for Corporate Governance and Citizenship (CCGC), Centre for Management Communication (CenComm), Centre for Public Policy (CPP), Centre for Software and Information Technology Management (CSITM), Centre for Teaching and Learning (CTL), India-Japan Study Centre (IJSC), Israel Centre, the innovation and entrepreneurship hub NSRCEL, and the Supply Chain Management Centre (SCMC). Moreover, there are four special initiatives, namely, the Behavioral Sciences Lab, Consumer Insights, Data Centre and Analytics Lab (DCAL) and the Real Estate Research Initiative (RERI).

 Digital Education IIMBx 
IIMB started offering Massive Open Online Courses (MOOCs) in 2014 through its digital learning initiative, IIMBx, in partnership with edX – a not-for-profit online initiative of Harvard and MIT. Apart from edX, the programme offers courses on its own platform, IIMBx, and Government of India's SWAYAM.

Alumni

In Popular Culture
The campus featured in the popular Bollywood film 3 Idiots directed by Rajkumar Hirani and starring Aamir Khan, Kareena Kapoor, Boman Irani, R. Madhavan and Sharman Joshi. The film is loosely based on the novel Five Point Someone'' by writer Chetan Bhagat. The 3 Idiots team saw over 400 colleges before finalising the beautiful campus of IIMB as the setting for the film.

See also
 Indian Institutes of Management
 Education in India

References

External links 

 
Business schools in Bangalore
Bangalore
Educational institutions established in 1973
1973 establishments in Karnataka